The rusty mouse-warbler (Origma murina), is a species of bird in the family Acanthizidae.  It is found in Indonesia and Papua New Guinea.  Its natural habitats are subtropical or tropical moist lowland forests and subtropical or tropical moist montane forests.

This species was formerly placed in the genus Crateroscelis, but following the publication of a molecular phylogenetic study of the scrubwrens and mouse-warblers in 2018, it was moved to the genus Origma.

References

Origma
Birds described in 1858
Taxonomy articles created by Polbot
Taxobox binomials not recognized by IUCN